Nizas is the name of two communes in France:

 Nizas, in the Gers department
 Nizas, in the Hérault department